Andre-Hugo Venter (born ) is a South African rugby union player for the  and the . His regular position is hooker.

Venter was named in the  squad for the Pro14 Rainbow Cup SA campaign.

References

External links
itsrugby.co.uk Profile

South African rugby union players
Living people
2001 births
Rugby union hookers
Stormers players
Western Province (rugby union) players